Canaano-Akkadian is an ancient Semitic language which was the written language of the Amarna letters from Canaan. It is a mixed language with mainly Akkadian vocabulary and Canaanite grammatical features. It used the cuneiform writing system of the Akkadian language.

References

Semitic languages
Mixed languages
Extinct languages of Asia